Linceo can refer to:

 A member of Accademia dei Lincei, often included in e.g. the member's signatures
 Fabio Colonna (1567-1640), Italian naturalist and botanist